Chuck Lenzie Generating Station is a  gas-fired power station located 30 miles north of Las Vegas, Nevada near the junction of Interstate 15 and the Great Basin Highway (Nevada State Route 93). Power is generated by two D-11 steam turbines powered by four 7FA combustion turbines.  The plant is the first owned since a plant built in 1955.

History 
The facility began construction in 2004 as a Duke Energy, power station.  The plant was sold to NV Energy and began production in 2006.

Facility 
Since it is located in a desert where water is limited, the plant uses a six-story-high dry cooling system.

Notes 

Energy infrastructure completed in 2006
Buildings and structures in North Las Vegas, Nevada
Natural gas-fired power stations in Nevada
2006 establishments in Nevada